A system of counties of New Zealand was instituted after the country dissolved its provinces in 1876, and these counties were similar to other countries' systems, lasting with little change (except mergers and other localised boundary adjustments) until 1989, when they were reorganised into district and city councils within a system of larger regions.

History
The Counties Bill of 1876 was initiated to merge 314 road boards into 39 counties.  However, as a result of lobbying the number of counties had grown to 63 by the time the bill was enacted.

They had chairmen, not mayors as boroughs and cities had; many legislative provisions (such as burial and land subdivision control) were different for the counties. By 1966, there were 112 counties.

During the second half of the 20th century, many counties received overflow population from nearby cities. The result was often a merger of the two into a "district"  (e.g., Rotorua) or a change of name to "district" (e.g., Waimairi) or "city"  (e.g., Manukau).

The Local Government Act 1974 began the process of bringing urban, mixed, and rural councils into the same legislative framework. Substantial reorganisations under that Act resulted in the 1989 local government reforms, which covered the country in (non-overlapping) cities and districts and abolished all the counties except for the Chatham Islands County, which survived under that name for a further six years but then became a "territory" under the "Chatham Islands Council".

The term is perpetuated in the name "Counties-Manukau", which refers to areas of South Auckland and the Franklin District and adjoining districts, and is applied to bodies as diverse as football clubs and health providers.

List of counties

North Island map 

 Mangonui
 Whangaroa
 Bay of Islands
 Hokianga
 Hobson
 Whangarei
 Otamatea
 Rodney
 Waitemata
 Eden
 Auckland
 Coromandel
 Manakau
 Thames
 Franklin
 Hauraki Plains
 Raglan
 Waikato
 Ohinemuri
 Piako
 Tauranga
 Matakaoa
 Waipa
 Opotoki
 Matamata
 Waiapu
 Rotorua
 Kawhia
 Otorohanga
 Whakatane
 Waikohu
 Uawa
 Waitomo
 Ohura
 Taumarunui
 Taupo
 Cook
 Wairoa
 Taranaki
 Clifton
 Whangamomona
 Inglewood
 Kaitieke
 Egmont
 Stratford
 Waimarino
 Hawkes Bay
 Eltham
 Waimate West
 Hawera
 Patea
 Wanganui
 Waitotara
 Kiwitea
 Waipawa
 Patangata
 Rangitikei
 Pohangina
 Waipukurau
 Oroua
 Dannevirke
 Manawatu
 Woodville
 Kairanga
 Weber
 Pahiatua
 Horowhenua
 Eketahuna
 Akitio
 Mauriceville
 Castlepoint
 Masterton
 Hutt
 Makara
 Wellington
 Featherston
 Wairarapa South

South Island map 

 Collingwood
 Takaka
 Waimea
 Marlborough
 Buller
 Awatere
 Murchison
 Inangahua
 Amuri
 Kaikoura
 Grey
 Cheviot
 Waipara
 Westland
 Selwyn
 Tawera
 Oxford
 Ashley
 Kowai
 Eyre
 Rangiora
 Malvern
 Paparua
 Waimairi
 Christchurch
 Halswell
 Heathcote
 Mt Herbert
 Ashburton
 Ellesmere
 Springs
 Wairewa
 Akaroa
 Mackenzie
 Geraldine
 Levels
 Lake
 Vincent
 Waitaki
 Waimate
 Maniototo
 Waihemo
 Fiord
 Wallace
 Southland
 Tuapeka
 Taieri
 Waikouaiti
 Peninsula
 Clutha
 Bruce
 Stewart Is

References 

 
1876 establishments in New Zealand
1989 disestablishments in New Zealand